Abrus is a genus of flowering plants in the pea family, Fabaceae and the only genus in the tribe Abreae. It contains 13–18 species, but is best known for a single species: jequirity (A. precatorius). The highly toxic seeds of that species are used to make jewellery.

Species
Abrus aureus R.Vig. (Madagascar)
Abrus baladensis  (Somalia)
Abrus bottae  (Saudi Arabia, Yemen)
Abrus canescens Welw. ex Baker (Africa)
Abrus cantoniensis Hance (China) 
Abrus diversifoliatus  (Madagascar)
Abrus fruticulosus Wall. ex Wight & Arn. (India)
Abrus gawenensis Thulin (Somalia)
Abrus kaokoensis Swanepoel & Kolberg (Namibia)
Abrus laevigatus E.Mey. (Southern Africa)
Abrus longibracteatus Labat (Laos, Vietnam)
Abrus madagascariensis  R.Vig. (Madagascar)
Abrus melanospermus Hassk. (Tropical & Subtropical Asia to SW. Pacific)
Abrus parvifolius (R.Vig.) Verdc. (Madagascar)
Abrus precatorius L. - Jequirity (Africa, Australia, Southeast Asia)
Abrus pulchellus Wall. ex Voigt (Africa) 
Abrus sambiranensis  R.Vig. (Madagascar)
Abrus schimperi Hochst. ex Baker (Africa) 
Abrus somalensis Taub. (Somalia)
Abrus wittei  Baker f. (Zaire)

References

Faboideae
Fabaceae genera